Ozotuncus is a genus of moths belonging to the family Tortricidae.

Species
Ozotuncus ozotuncus Razowski, 1997

See also
List of Tortricidae genera

References

 , 2005: World catalogue of insects volume 5 Tortricidae.
 , 1997, Acta zoologica cracoviensia 40: 82

External links
tortricidae.com

Euliini
Tortricidae genera